Ho Anh Thai, one of the best contemporary novelists in Vietnam, is regarded as a literary phenomenon of the post-war generation.

Biography

Ho Anh Thai was born in 1960 in Hanoi. He graduated from Hanoi University of Diplomacy in 1983. After graduation, he worked as a diplomat abroad, especially in India, Iran and Indonesia. Fluent in several foreign languages, he earned a Ph.D. in Oriental Studies and he is also an Indologist and a visiting professor in the University of Washington and foreign universities. 

Ho Anh Thai was the elected president of Hanoi Writers’ Association from 2000 to 2010. And he was appointed the Vietnam Deputy Ambassador to Iran (2011-2015), and Indonesia (2015-2018).

Literary career
Ho Anh Thai first became known as a literary teenage prodigy with the publication of his first stories. As he matured, he became a voice for his generation, with his fresh, youthful style of writing, and works that centered on the lives and adventures of young people and students, highlighting their desire to discover the world. Some of his works of this period are the novels Men and Vehicle Run in the Moonlight (1986), The Women on the Island (1986), Behind the Red Mist (1989) and the short story collections The Goat Meat Special (1988), Fragment of a Man (1991), etc.
 
Early in the 1990s, he published a series of humorous and thoughtful stories about the six years he has spent in India: The Man Who Stood on One Leg, The Indian, A Sigh through the Laburnums, The Barter, etc. 

From the 2000s, his published books became more experimental, playful in language and marked by a wry and sardonic tone that was both much appreciated by his growing readership and also considered controversial: the novels The Apocalypse Hotel (2002), Ten and One Nights (2006), RHT is Rat Hunt Team (2011), Erased by the Wind (2012),  His Children are Scattered on the Road (2014), Burning Van Gogh (2018), Five Letters of Credence (2019) etc. and short stories collections The Narration of 265 Days (2001), Four Paths to the Fun House (2004), Man is Here and the Sky is There (2013) etc. 

Ho Anh Thai came back to the theme of India with the novel The Buddha, Savitri and I, published in 2007. This is the first Vietnamese novel which contemporizes the Buddha through an interesting plot and simple style set in a multi-layered structure which effectively broadens his use of time and space. In 2022 he published another novel about ancient India, The Buddha, the Robber Queen and the Spy.

Ho Anh Thai's books have always been best-sellers; part of the phenomenon of his work is that he has a large readership in spite of the way he has eschewed formulaic writing and strives for freshness and originality in form and language. 
His fiction has been published abroad, translated into over ten languages, including English, French, Korean, Swedish etc.

Selected works

 Chàng trai ở bến đợi xe (The Boy Who Waits at the Bus-stop, 1985)
 Phía sau vòm trời (1986)
 Vẫn chưa tới mùa đông (Winter is Not Here,Yet, 1986)
 Người và xe chạy dưới ánh trăng (Men and Vehicle Run in the Moonlight, 1987)
 Người đàn bà trên đảo (The Women on the Island, 1988)
 Những cuộc kiếm tìm (The Searches, 1988)
 Mai phục trong đêm hè (Ambush in the Summer Nights, 1989)
 Trong sương hồng hiện ra (Behind the Red Mist, 1990)
 Mảnh vỡ của đàn ông (Fragment of a Man, 1993)
 Người đứng một chân (The Man Who Stood on One Leg 1995)
 Lũ con hoang (The Bastards, 1995)
 Tiếng thở dài qua rừng kim tước (A Sigh through the Laburnums, 1998)
 Họ trở thành nhân vật của tôi (They Have Become My Characters, 2000)
 Tự sự 265 ngày (The Narration in 265 Days, 2001)
 Cõi người rung chuông tận thế (Apocalypse Hotel, 2002)
 Bốn lối vào nhà cười (Four Paths to the Fun House, 2005)
 Đức Phật, nàng Sivitri và tôi (The Buddha, Savitri and I, 2007)
 Mười lẻ một đêm (Ten and One Nights, 2006)
 Namaskar! Xin chào Ấn Độ (Namaskar, hello India!, 2008)
 Hướng nào Hà Nội cũng sông (Hanoi is Embraced by the Rivers, 2009)
 SBC là săn bắt chuột (RHT is Rat Hunt Team, 2011)
 Dấu về gió xóa (Erased by the Wind, 2012)
 Người bên này trời bên ấy (Man is Here and the Sky is There, 2013)
 Những đứa con rải rác trên đường (His Children are Scattered on the Road, 2014)
 Salam, chào xứ Ba Tư (Salam, Persia!, 2014)
 Tự kể (Self-told Stories, 2016).
 Lang thang trong chữ (Wandering in Words, 2016).
 Hồ Anh Thái - Kịch (Ho Anh Thai: Plays, 2017).
 Apa kabar, chào xứ vạn đảo (Hello, Indonesia!, 2017)
 Tranh Van Gogh mua để đốt (Burning Van Gogh, 2018).
 Chốc lát những bến bờ (The Moments in the Shores, 2019).
 Tự mình cách biệt (Self Isolated, 2019).
 Năm lá quốc thư (Five Letters of Credence, 2019).
 Ở lại để chờ nhau (Staying to Wait for Each Other, 2020)
 Bắt đầu cất lên tiếng cười (Starting a Laughter, 2021)
 Đức Phật, Nữ Chúa và điệp viên (The Buddha, the Robber Queen and the Spy, 2022).
 Hà Nội nhiều mây có lúc có mưa ngâu (Ha Noi Will be Cloudy with Chance of Love Rains, 2023)

Awards

 Short story prize 1983-1984 of Van Nghe (Literature and Arts) newspaper for The Boy Who Waits at the Bus-stop.
 Best novel award (5-year award, 1986–1990) of the Vietnam Writers’ Association and the Vietnam Trade Union for Men and Vehicle Run in the Moonlight.
 Literature award 1995 of the Union of Literature and Art Associations for The Man Who Stood on One Leg.
 Annual prize 2002 of the Vietnam Writers’ Association for The Narration in 265 Days (refused by author).
 Annual Prize 2012 for the Best Novel of Ha Noi Writers' Association for RHT is Rat Hunt Team.
 Book Prize 2015 of Vietnam Publishers' Association for the novel His Children are Scattered on the Road.
 Book Prize 2016 of IRED and Phan Chau Trinh Culture Foundation for the novel Apocalypse Hotel.

References 

1. Published by University of Washington Press.

2. Published by Curbstone Press, USA.

External links
Ho Anh Thai:

 http://www.curbstone.org/authdetail.cfm?AuthID=37
 http://www.congrexnetwork.com/dbs/waltic/dyncat.cfm?catid=190#ho 

Behind the Red Mist:
 https://www.h-net.org/reviews/showpdf.php?id=2595

The Women on the Island:
 https://vietnamnews.vn/sunday/518662/revisiting-the-woman-on-the-island.html#SoSugEubIhmqS21U.97

Apocalypse Hotel:
 https://www.amazon.com/Apocalypse-Hotel-Modern-Southeast-Literature/dp/089672803X

Some short stories: 	
 https://vietnamnews.vn/sunday/short-stories/185250/garbage-and-passion.html#6dbHfCMIfFmZ22V8.97
 https://vietnamnews.vn/sunday/short-stories/466118/the-sun-never-sets.html#riOwbeVfifGJbH6V.97
 https://vietnamnews.vn/sunday/short-stories/450938/a-scoop-of-holy-water.html#8fMX2bixpcTo1Fhc.97

Vietnamese writers
Living people
Date of birth missing (living people)
Place of birth missing (living people)
1960 births